Among Vultures (German: Unter Geiern) is a 1964 Western film directed by Alfred Vohrer and starring Stewart Granger, Pierre Brice, Elke Sommer and Götz George. It was also released as Frontier Hellcat.

The film was a co-production between West Germany, France, Italy and Yugoslavia. It was shot at the Spandau Studios in Berlin and on location in Yugoslavia, particularly in Croatia. The film's sets were designed by the art director Vladimir Tadej. The story is based on the eponymous novel by Karl May.

Plot
An American frontiersman Old Surehand and his Apache companion Winnetou expose a criminal gang who are murdering settlers and laying the blame on the local Native American tribe.

Cast
 Stewart Granger as Old Surehand
 Pierre Brice as Winnetou
 Elke Sommer as Annie Dillman
 Götz George as Martin Baumann Jr.
 Walter Barnes as Martin Baumann Sr.
 Sieghardt Rupp as Preston
 Miha Baloh as Reverend Weler
 Renato Baldini as Judge Leader
 Terence Hill as Baker
 Louis Velle as Gordon
 Gojko Mitić as Wokadeh 
 Milan Srdoč as Old Wabble

See also 
 Karl May films

References

External links
 
 Among Vultures at filmportal.de/en

1964 films
1964 Western (genre) films
Columbia Pictures films
Constantin Film films
Films directed by Alfred Vohrer
Films produced by Horst Wendlandt
Films set in New Mexico
Films set in the 19th century
Films shot at Spandau Studios
Films shot in Croatia
Films shot in Germany
Films shot in Yugoslavia
French Western (genre) films
German Western (genre) films
1960s German-language films
Italian Western (genre) films
West German films
Winnetou films
Yugoslav Western (genre) films
1960s Italian films
1960s French films
1960s German films
Foreign films set in the United States